Isoamylase (debranching enzyme, glycogen alpha-1,6-glucanohydrolase) is an enzyme with systematic name glycogen 6-alpha-D-glucanohydrolase. This enzyme catalyses the following chemical reaction

 Hydrolysis of (1->6)-alpha-D-glucosidic branch linkages in glycogen, amylopectin and their beta-limit dextrins

This enzyme also readily hydrolyses amylopectin.

See also 
Glycogen debranching enzyme
DBR1

References

External links 
 

EC 3.2.1